Farmersville is a city in the San Joaquin Valley in Tulare County, California, United States, just to the east of Visalia, California. The population was 10,588 at the 2010 census, up from 8,737 at the 2000 census. The current population of Farmersville, California is 10,359 based on our projections of the latest US Census estimates.

The city helps sponsor many events throughout the year, including a Memorial Day Parade in May, which is well attended and manage to draw around 4,000 visitors from the surrounding areas every Memorial Day. In October a Fall Festival is held on the downtown boulevard. In December a Christmas Tree Lighting event is held at the Old Methodist Church building.

History
The history of Farmersville began in the 1850s. This early community was called Deep Creek, located near the present Deep Creek Cemetery. There are headstones that date back to the 1850s.

Farmersville's first school was built there to accommodate the farm children in the area. In the Fly family history, which is preserved in a book written about their travels to California, there is talk about attending the Deep Creek School in the 1860s. It was located East of the Cemetery.

Until 1863, other residents living on the east side of the county traveled through Farmersville on the Visalia Road. They rode their horse-drawn wagons to get their mail, purchase supplies and bring their goods to sell. The trip was long, so many would stop at the Wiley Hinds farm, just south of present-day Farmersville, to ask to sleep in his barn and continue their trip home the next day. Wiley Hinds was a former slave, and came from Arkansas with his brother, Archibald, in 1858. He settled in Farmersville, purchased other parcels for farming, and became very prosperous.
 
In 1866 two entrepreneurs, John Crowley and his brother in law Merrill Jasper opened a large general store in Farmersville. They wanted to capture the sales of residents on the east side of the county on their way to Visalia to get their mail. Unfortunately, they were not successful. In 1868 their nephew and also store manager Thomas J. Brundage, purchased the business from them. During this time the application for the Post Office and the name of the town were finally approved by the US Government. The store now became much more successful and eastern residents began to stop and pick up their mail. Mr. Brundage also had a lumber yard across the street from the general store. Oxen would pull the lumber shipment from the Sierra hills. Just east of the Brundage General Store was the Brown Hotel. It was constructed in 1870 for Edward Balaam and was later purchased by Charles Brown. The hotel was two stories and served meals to passengers during the horse changeover for the Overland Stage. Brown also owned the livery stable. The location of the Brundage General Merchandise store and the Brown Hotel is near what is now Sam's Foods Supermarket (old Nickel's Payless store), commemorated by a historic granite marker in the parking lot.

There was a large fire in 1910 that hit the corner of Visalia Rd and Farmersville Blvd. The Brundage General store received fire damage. The fire also burned a couple of other businesses and buildings and scorched the Methodist Church. This old wooden store was later known as Farmersville Trading Post and being destroyed in a fire in 1951. It was replaced with a Texaco Gas Station, which later became a Beacon Gas station. Today it is an empty lot.

In 1910 Thomas J. Brundage's son, Oscar G. Brundage, who took over the general store decided to build an additional store, this time made of brick. It was completed in December 1910. He continued working in the stores at least until the late 1920s. Later it became Dixon's Grocery Store, owned by Floyd Dixon. After that, it became Ryan's Grocery Store. In the 1940's it became a bar called the Frontier Club. It was finally destroyed in a fire in the 1960s. It sat on the Southeast corner of Visalia Rd and Farmersville Blvd, where Rainbow's Drive In sits today.

In 1945 the town had voted to pay for its own police department. The town had one Police Officer on duty during this time. Before 1960, the town was under the authority of the County. A small group of residents presented themselves to these officials for any needs of the town.

Discussion to incorporate started as early as 1945. Don Freeman began the petition and application process that lead to the city's incorporation on October 5, 1960. The first city council was composed of James Tornow, Mayor, Truman Qualls, Don Freeman, Willis Freeman, and Jim Steven. Carl Waddle was the first City Clerk. Early on the City struggled to get proper water delivery and wastewater treatment. In 1968 the Wastewater treatment plant loan was made for $480,000 to build the first plant and transmission infrastructure. The city residents in 1968 seriously discussed dis-incorporation led by store owner Tom Bray.

Geography
Farmersville is located at  (36.301169, -119.207603).

Demographics

2010
The 2010 United States Census reported that Farmersville had a population of 10,588. The population density was 4,688.2 inhabitants per square mile. The racial makeup of Farmersville was 5,295 (50.0%) White, 60 (0.6%) African American, 213 (2.0%) Native American, 72 (0.7%) Asian, 5 (0.0%) Pacific Islander, 4,494 (42.4%) from other races, and 449 (4.2%) from two or more races. Hispanic or Latino of any race were 8,876 persons (83.8%).

There were 2,595 households, out of which 1,639 (63.2%) had children under the age of 18 living in them, 1,474 (56.8%) were married couples living together, 515 (19.8%) had a female householder with no husband present, 274 (10.6%) had a male householder with no wife present. There were 257 (9.9%) unmarried partnerships, and 10 (0.4%) same-sex couples. 258 households (9.9%) were made up of individuals, and 110 (4.2%) had someone living alone who was 65 years of age or older. The average household size was 4.08. There were 2,263 families (87.2% of all households). The population was spread out, with 3,895 people (36.8%) under the age of 18, 1,234 people (11.7%) aged 18 to 24, 2,941 people (27.8%) aged 25 to 44, 1,822 people (17.2%) aged 45 to 64, and 696 people (6.6%) who were 65 years of age or older. The median age was 26.2 years. 
There were 2,726 housing units at an average density of 1,207.0 per square mile, of which 1,590 (61.3%) were owner-occupied, and 1,005 (38.7%) were occupied by renters. The homeowner vacancy rate was 2.5%; the rental vacancy rate was 4.2%. 6,537 people (61.7% of the population) lived in owner-occupied housing units and 4,051 people (38.3%) lived in rental housing units.

2000
As of the census there were 8,737 people, 2,151 households, and 1,854 families residing in the city. The population density was 4,655.2 inhabitants per square mile. There were 2,269 housing units at an average density of 1,209.0 per square mile. The racial makeup of the city was 42.36% White, 0.40% African American, 1.76% Native American, 1.14% Asian, 0.03% Pacific Islander, 48.35% Hispanic from other races, and 5.95% from two or more races.

There were 2,151 households, out of which 54.8% had children under the age of 18 living with them, 61.8% were married couples living together, 16.6% had a female householder with no husband present, and 13.8% were non-families. 10.6% of all households were made up of individuals, and 5.3% had someone living alone who was 65 years of age or older. The average household size was 4.05 and the average family size was 4.32. The median age was 24 years.
The median income for a household in the city was $27,682, and the median income for a family was $29,629. The per capita income for the city was $8,624. About 23.6% of families and 30.7% of the population were below the poverty line.

Government

Local
Mayor Tina Hernandez is a Real Estate Agent. Vice Mayor Danny Valdovinos Jr is the owner of KO Gym in Farmersville. Councilmember Gregorio Gomez is a Systems Administrator for the Tulare County Information and Communications Technology Department. Councilmember Paul Boyer is a retired Development Program Director for Self-Help Enterprises. Councilmember Armando Hinojosa is a self employed online businessman and photographer.

The City Manager is Jennifer Gomez, hired in 2018.

Mayors of Farmersville
(1960) James Tornow... (1962) Jim Stevens... (1965) Ralph Barnes... (1966) J. W. Kemp... (1973) Leo Havner... (1974) Herb Jones... (1980) Larry Miller... (1982) Charles Felix... (1984) Joe Alvarado... (1986) Don Rowlett... (1988) Al Vanderslice... (1996) Mike Riddle... (1998) Myron Wiley... (2000) Tommy Blackmon... (2002) Paul Boyer... (2004) Michael Santana... (2006) Pastor Leonel Benavides... (2014) Gregorio Gomez...  (2016) Paul Boyer... (2022) Tina Hernandez

Representatives
Representing Farmersville in the County of Tulare is Supervisor Larry Micari. In the United States House of Representatives, Farmersville is in the 22nd District represented by David Valadao. In the United States Senate representing us in the 16th District is Melissa Hurtado. The Governor is Gavin Newsom.

Past & Present Notable Figures

( Baseball ) Tim Sweeney, Ray Martin, Ralph Pizarro, Dillard Ferguson, Nolan Phillips, Lazarro Cardenas, Matt Sisk.. ( Veterans ) Marie Pizarro, Alfred Thomas, Rod Hughes, Oscar Deleon..  ( Builders) Roy Marshall, John Martin..  ( Medicine ) Charles Clark, Kenneth Womack, Dr. Richard Armstrong.. ( Firemen ) Larry Miller, Pat Taylor.. ( Youth Sports ) Deborah Holt Vasquez, Ricardo Maldonado, Daniel Valdovinos Jr., Candy Becerra, Daniel Becerra, Christian Cervantes..  (Store Owners) Ralph Barnes, Alfred Thomas, Rafael & Octaviana Vasquez, Rosa Vasquez, Rudy and Jesse Tafoya, Paul Freeman, David Chan..  ( Community Leaders ) Raymond Estes, Tom Bray, Daniel Ybarra, Ralph Ramos, Dr. George Castaneda, Ted Sanchez, Nellie Burt, Anna & Saul Winslow, Audrey & Frank Pineda, Rene Miller, Paul Boyer, Pastor Leonel Benavides, John Alvarez, Alice Lopez, Armando Hinojosa

Restaurants
Boss Hoggs' Restaurant is a popular local diner featuring classic American cooking. Boss Hoggs and the Donut Shop serve as morning gathering places. Other businesses in town are Los Arbolitos, Rainbow Drive In, El Salvador Restaurant, Don Chava's Restaurant, Ana Maria's and Taqueria El Tapatio and Jack in the Box. By the Hwy 198 are McDonalds, Subway, and Taco Bell.

Business
Farmersville serves occasionally as a commuter town, many residents having to travel to nearby communities to seek employment. Local commerce is composed primarily of small, family-owned businesses. Its stores include Sam's Foods Supermarket, Vista Market, Dolores Handcrafts, La Mejor Del Valle, Muebleria El Alto Furniture, Farmersville Florist, Farmersville Minute Mart, Farmersville Feed & Seed, Dollar General, Dollar Tree, Rite Aide, AutoZone, O'Reilly's and CB Performance.

Schools

Farmersville has a single unified school district with Farmersville High School (the Aztecs), a middle school, and three elementary schools. J.E. Hester School is for kindergartners and 1st graders. George L. Snowden is for 2nd and 3rd graders. Freedom is for 4th, 5th and 6th graders. The junior high school is for 7th and 8th graders and the Farmersville High School covers 9th through 12th grade. ( Past & Current School Leaders ) Supt. George L Snowden, Supt. Lenno Johnston, Teacher Kenneth Kramer, Supt. Don Sato, Supt. Janet Jones, Trustee John Vasquez, Trustee Al Vanderslice, Trustee Don Mason, Trustee Alice Lopez, Trustee John Alvarez, Principal Gary Carter

School History
The first school mentioned in history writings was located near the Deep Creek Cemetery, it was made of logs and the years indicated were 1860's. The second school was built around 1869-1904 by the Farmers Alliance Organization. It was a two-story building with the classrooms on the second floor, and a community room on the first floor for meetings and social events. It was located on the Southwest corner of Visalia Rd and Farmersville Blvd. It was later replaced by a larger building, Farmersville Elementary School 1905-1952. It was replaced with Snowden Elementary in 1953. Hester School was opened earlier in 1950. Both schools were dedicated in 1953. Teacher and later School Supt George L Snowden played a major part of the decision making in the construction of Hester and Snowden School.

Farmersville Methodist Church

Built in the 1870s in Goshen, California, and after little usage the Visalia Methodist congregation purchased the church with the help of Farmersville church members in 1899-1900. The chapel was rolled into Farmersville on logs, pulled by horses sometime afterward. It was established on South Farmersville Boulevard just south of Visalia Road, also known as the "Four Corners". The Founders of the early Farmersville Methodist Church were Thomas J Brundage, Mr Sims and Rev. G. E. Foster. Sometime around 1947 with a need for more parking, a new location was found when Mrs. Avery donated a parcel of her land. That new site was Avery Ave and Ash Street. During the move, the steeple broke and was rebuilt using fishtail shingles. In later years it became the Farmersville United Methodist Church and continued until March 2004. The Boys and Girls Club took over the building for a couple of years. In 2009 it found a new location and was moved to N Farmersville Boulevard and W. Front Street.

Nationwide Attention
 Orval Overall, winning pitcher of Chicago Cubs' final game of 1908 World Series, was born in Farmersville.
 Russ Taff, southern gospel and pop singer, was born in Farmersville.
 Martin and Mary Macareno in 1981 entered a dance contest on ABC American Bandstand with host Dick Clark. Mary owns Dolores Handcrafts in Farmersville. Martin after the show became heavily involved in community activities and was elected to the school board. He later moved to Greenfield California and continued working in community events and activities. He passed away in July of 2007.

References

External links

Farmersville Unified School District
Foothill-Sun Gazette Newspaper

1960 establishments in California
Cities in Tulare County, California
Incorporated cities and towns in California
Populated places established in 1960
San Joaquin Valley